United Nations Security Council resolution 1369, adopted unanimously on 14 September 2001, after reaffirming resolutions 1298 (1999), 1308 (2000), 1312 (2000), 1320 (2000) and 1344 (2001) on the situation between Eritrea and Ethiopia, the Council extended the mandate of the United Nations Mission in Ethiopia and Eritrea (UNMEE) until 15 March 2002.

Resolution

Observations
The security council reaffirmed the need for both Eritrea and Ethiopia to respect international law, humanitarian law, human rights and refugee law and to ensure the safety and security of international humanitarian personnel. It reaffirmed its support for the Comprehensive Peace Agreement signed between the governments of both countries and welcomed the implementation of the agreements through the establishment of a Temporary Security Zone (TSZ) and constitution of the Boundary and Claims Commissions.

Acts
Extending UNMEE's mandate, the parties were called upon to co-operate fully with the UNMEE mission. The council stressed that UNMEE's termination was linked to the completion of the work of the Boundary Commission regarding the demarcation of the Ethiopia-Eritrea border, and emphasised that the TSZ had to be completely demilitarised. The parties were called upon to implement the following measures:

(a) allow freedom of movement for UNMEE so it could monitor the area 15 km north and south of the TSZ;
(b) facilitate the establishment of an air corridor between the capitals of Addis Ababa and Asmara;
(c) Eritrea had to provide information on police and militia inside the TSZ;
(d) Ethiopia had to provide information on minefields;
(e) Eritrea had to conclude a Status of Forces Agreement;
(f) release and return prisoners of war;
(g) fulfill financial responsibilities regarding the Boundary Commission.

The parties were also asked to consider confidence-building measures, including affording humane treatment to each other's nationals, exercising restraint in public statements and assisting in contacts between organisations of both countries. The international community was called upon to support the peace process through voluntary contributions, assistance in reconstruction and development, the reintegration of demobilised soldiers and discouraging arms flows to the region.

Finally, both Ethiopia and Eritrea were urged to ensure efforts were targeted on reconstruction and development of their respective economies rather than on weapons procurement. The council would continue to monitor the implementation of the Algiers Agreements and current Security Council resolution before the mandate of UNMEE would be renewed.

See also
 Algiers Agreement (2000)
 Eritrean–Ethiopian War
 List of United Nations Security Council Resolutions 1301 to 1400 (2000–2002)

References

External links
 
Text of the Resolution at undocs.org

 1369
2001 in Eritrea
2001 in Ethiopia
 1369
 1369
Eritrea–Ethiopia border
September 2001 events